Seethamma Vakitlo Sirimalle Chettu, also known by the initialism SVSC, is a 2013 Indian Telugu-language family drama film written and directed by Srikanth Addala. It was produced by Dil Raju's Sri Venkateswara Creations, and stars Venkatesh, Mahesh Babu, Anjali and Samantha, while Prakash Raj, Jayasudha, Rao Ramesh, Kota Srinivasa Rao, Abhinaya and Rohini Hattangadi play supporting roles.

In addition to directing the film, Addala worked on the script for three years after the release of his directorial debut, Kotha Bangaru Lokam (2008). He wrote the screenplay, and Ganesh Patro wrote the film's dialogue. Mickey J. Meyer and Mani Sharma composed the soundtrack and score, respectively. Marthand K. Venkatesh edited the film and K. V. Guhan was its cinematographer. Production began on 6 October 2011 in Hyderabad; principal photography began on 18 January 2012 in Visakhapatnam, and finished on 24 December. In addition to Hyderabad, scenes were filmed in coastal Andhra Pradesh, Tamil Nadu and Kerala.

It was considered the first major multi-starrer film in Telugu cinema at the time after a gap of twenty to thirty years. Seethamma Vakitlo Sirimalle Chettu was released worldwide on 11 January 2013 to generally positive reviews. The film was commercially successful, earning a distributor share of 51 crore on a budget of 40 crore, and was the second-highest-grossing Telugu film of the year (after Attarintiki Daredi). It received seven nominations at the 61st Filmfare Awards South and eleven nominations at the 3rd South Indian International Movie Awards, winning two awards at each: Best Actor Male — Telugu (Mahesh Babu) and Best Playback Singer Female — Telugu (K. S. Chithra). The film won four Nandi Awards, including the Award for Best Home-viewing Feature Film.

Plot 
A kind-hearted man addressed as Relangi Mavayya by his near and dear after his hometown Relangi lives with his close-knit family comprising his wife, mother, and three children—two sons Peddodu (the "elder") and Chinnodu (the "younger") and a daughter Chinni, niece Seetha who is the daughter of Relangi Mavayya's late sister and her husband. Peddodu is in an introverted person who lives life on his own terms while Chinnodu is a talkative, flirtatious and brilliant person. Peddodu resigns from his job at the company of a relative Brahmananda Rao for being insulted due to his stubborn attitude. Everyone thinks that Seetha and Peddodu would marry and Seetha to have hidden feelings for Peddodu but is unhappy with the fact that Peddodu has never addressed her with the name and rather addresses her as "Hey" and "Oye".

After attending the wedding of Geetha's elder sister, Chinnodu falls for Geetha, younger daughter of Seetha's paternal uncle who is a highly self-centered personality and constantly denigrates the economic status of Relangi Mavayya and unemployment of his sons. Geetha's elder sister recommends a marriage proposal to Chinni with relatives of her in-laws. At the wedding, Peddodu and Geetha's father argue over the latter's sarcasm further intensifying the tensions between families. Days later, Peddodu and Chinnodu leave for city to find employment and Geetha invites Chinnodu for lunch in a restaurant, hiding the fact that her whole family is there. Chinnodu receives a lukewarm welcome and argues with Geetha's father when he demeans Peddodu and Relangi Mavayya. When Geetha tries to cool Chinnodu, Peddodu spots them together and feels upset about their relationship. He leaves to his village and Chinnodu's relationship with Geetha is ruined.

Geetha's father finds her a proposal but her grandmother refuses to let her marry until Seetha is married. When Relangi Mavayya visits them, Geetha's father discourages his interest in getting Peddodu married to Seetha and finds a proposal for the latter. Seetha is pressured to accept her marriage but the alliance gets spoiled. Relangi Mavayya is injured in an accident while protecting a young boy and gets hospitalized but survives with minor injuries. As the young boy is the nephew of Brahmananda Rao, the latter offers job to Peddodu for second time. Peddodu and Chinnodu's rift widens.

Relangi Mavayya attends the annual Kalyanam of Rama and Sita in Bhadrachalam with his family where to their surprise, Geetha and her family too arrive. The guest of honour, A MLA requests Relangi Mavayya to lead the procession having had a good impression of him in their last meeting surprising Geetha's father. A short circuit takes place and people at the place panic. Setting their differences aside, Peddodu and Chinnodu rescue Geetha's family and other devotees who attended the Kalyanam from danger. Relangi Mavayya praises the brothers and remind them of their love for each other and tells them about the importance of adjusting, brotherhood and family. This changes their attitude and they reconcile. Geetha's father who overheard their conversation realizes his mistake. Peddodu addresses Seetha by her name indicating that he is ready to marry her.

Geetha's father gets them married and plan to get Chinnodu married to Geetha. Peddodu and Chinnodu, having secured jobs buy their paternal grandmother bangles as she desired earlier.

Cast 

 Venkatesh as Peddodu 
 Mahesh Babu as Chinnodu 
 Anjali as Seetha
 Samantha as Geetha
 Prakash Raj as Relangi Mavayya (Relangi Uncle), Peddodu and Chinnodu's father
 Jayasudha as Peddodu and Chinnodu's mother
 Abhinaya as Chinni
 Rao Ramesh as Geetha's father
 Kota Srinivasa Rao as Brahmananda Rao
 Rohini Hattangadi as Seetha's maternal grandmother
 Rama Prabha as Seetha's paternal grandmother
 Ahuti Prasad as Geetha's uncle
 Tanikella Bharani as Kondala Rao
 Ravi Babu as Goodu Raju, Kondala Rao's son
 Murali Mohan as MLA
 Dhanya Balakrishna as a girl who proposes to Chinnodu
 Kalpika Ganesh as Geetha's elder sister
 Tejaswi Madivada as Geetha's younger sister
 Venu Madhav as Census Officer
 Praveen as Peddodu's friend 
 Satya Dev as Chinnodu's friend
 Srinivasa Reddy as Peddodu's friend
 Raja Ravindra as Police Officer
 Prabhas Sreenu as Goodu Raju's friend
 Pruthviraj 
 Rajitha as Geetha's mother
 Daksha Nagarkar (uncredited role)

Production

Development 
After the release of his directorial debut, Kotha Bangaru Lokam (2008), Srikanth Addala worked for three years on Seethamma Vakitlo Sirimalle Chettu script. After Vedam release, in June 2010 Dil Raju began planning a film directed by Addala and featuring Venkatesh and Pawan Kalyan as the male leads. Scripting began, and the film's title was announced in September. When the project stalled, Addala approached Mahesh Babu with its script in June 2011.

Babu agreed to act in the film after Addala met him to read the script during pre-production for Dookudu (2011). He and Venkatesh cited the script's emotional depth and realistic approach as the reason they signed for the film. Addala approached Ganesh Patro in Chennai to write the film's dialogue. Patro used the dialect spoken in the Godavari region of Andhra Pradesh, edited by Addala. It was his final project as a dialogue writer before his death in January 2015. K. V. Guhan, who worked on the previous Babu films Athadu (2005) and Dookudu, was signed as Seethamma Vakitlo Sirimalle Chettu cinematographer.

Mickey J. Meyer, who worked with Addala on the director's debut, composed the film's soundtrack and Mani Sharma composed its score. Sharma had composed the score for Raju's 2011 production, Oh My Friend, whose soundtrack was composed by Rahul Raj. Although production began in Hyderabad on the eve of Vijayadasami (6 October 2011) with a launch ceremony, Venkatesh and Babu did not attend due to previous film commitments. "Simple but beautiful" was announced as the film's advertising slogan in June 2012.

Casting 

Seethamma Vakitlo Sirimalle Chettu is considered the first Telugu star-studded film in the last two or three decades. After listening to Addala's narration, Venkatesh felt that they could work more on the film's script and the director agreed. The actor agreed to the film because he considered it a safe bet which would appeal to a family audience. Raju was interested in casting Babu as the lead for two reasons: the film, revolving around two brothers, required two popular actors as the leads and the producer again wanted to work with the actor after Murari (2001), Takkari Donga (2002), Okkadu (2003) and Athadu. Guhan told The Hindu that Venkatesh's and Babu's unnamed characters would simply be called Peddodu and Chinnodu, respectively. The film is considered to be the first multi-starrer of Telugu cinema in recent decades.

Samantha Ruth Prabhu was signed to play Babu's love interest in the film, and Raju asked her to allow 40 days for shooting. After Trisha,  Bhumika Chawla and Anushka Shetty were considered for the other female lead, Amala Paul was signed in mid-December 2011. After a photo shoot and the beginning of principal photography, Paul left the project in late January 2012 and Raju replaced her with Anjali.

Prakash Raj was cast in a principal role as the brothers' father. When he failed to join the film unit in Kutralam, it was rumoured that he had walked out of the film due to differences with Raju but Raju denied the reports. Jayasudha and Rohini Hattangadi were signed for supporting roles, and Hattangadi said that she would play the brothers' grandmother. Rao Ramesh played Samantha's father in the film.

Miss Dabur Gulabari 2011 second runner-up Tejaswi Madivada was signed for a supporting role in her acting debut, and Abhinaya was cast as Babu's sister in the film. Rama Prabha, Tanikella Bharani, Kota Srinivasa Rao, Brahmanandam and Ahuti Prasad later joined the film's supporting cast. Traditional and formal costumes were supplied by the clothing chain Kalamandir.

Filming 

Principal photography began on 18 January 2012 in Visakhapatnam, where several of Venkatesh's scenes were filmed near the Andhra University campus and on the Ramakrishna Mission Beach. The next shooting schedule began in Kutralam, Tamil Nadu, on 6 February 2012 and filming continued in Hyderabad during March. In Sanathnagar a crowd disrupted shooting, and the film's crew chose an undisclosed location to resume. Samantha joined the film unit on 28 March. After shooting was disrupted three times in Hyderabad by crowds, Babu suggested that Raju move production to Chennai (where several wedding scenes were filmed at a coconut plantation). Rain increased production costs.

Part of the song "Yem Cheddaam" was shot at the Sabarmati Riverfront in mid-April, the riverfront's first appearance in a Telugu film. In addition to the riverfront, scenes were filmed over a fifteen-day schedule in shopping malls and gardens around Ahmedabad. Addala chose the city for its developing infrastructure, friendly people and climatic similarity to Hyderabad. On 31 May 2012, Raju told the media that 35 percent of Seethamma Vakitlo Sirimalle Chettu filming was completed and the next shooting schedule would begin at Ramoji Film City. A house set worth 10 million was built at the studio under the supervision of A. S. Prakash. Venkatesh and Anjali began a four-day shooting schedule at Ahobilam on 4 July. After several key scenes were filmed in Relangi, near Tanuku, a new schedule began in Bhadrachalam on 16 July.

Filming was delayed when Samantha became ill, resuming on 19 August after her recovery. By mid-September, the producers had filmed for nearly 80 working days. Wedding and other crucial scenes were filmed in Chennai. By then the shooting of five songs was completed, with work on two more songs and detail work pending. Raju planned two shooting schedules: one from 28 September to 12 October, and the other from 15 November to the end of the month. Filming continued on 2 October 2012 at Ramanaidu Studios. The film's climactic scenes were shot in mid-November 2012 on a custom-built Bhadrachalam Temple set at Ramoji Film City, and the dialogue was wrapped up on 17 November.

A song featuring Babu and Samantha was shot in Magarpatta, Pune, in early December, and scenes following Chinni's wedding were filmed in Dwaraka Tirumala. Another song featuring Venkatesh and Anjali was shot in Kerala under the supervision of Prem Rakshith; its completion marked the end of principal photography on 24 December.

Post-production 
On 6 October 2012, a pooja commemorated the beginning of the film's dubbing. Post-production was planned simultaneously for a December 2012 release. On 23 October, Samantha began dubbing her role in the film. This was the first time she dubbed for herself in a Telugu film; her roles had previously been dubbed by the singer Chinmayi. Babu began dubbing his role on 10 December; Venkatesh had completed most of his dubbing work by then, with only a few reels remaining.

In mid-December, Samantha said that she had dubbed 40 percent of her role and the producers would decide if her voice would be retained; Chinmayi and Dubbing Janaki were later chosen to dub for Prabhu and Hattangadi. Babu finished dubbing his role by early January 2013, and post-production ended on 3 January. The first copy of the film was sent to the Central Board of Film Certification on 7 January, and it was cleared by the Board the following day.

Themes 

Raju said in early October 2011 that Seethamma Vakitlo Sirimalle Chettu would be a family drama; its title focuses on the family system in India, a part of the Indian ideology of one world family. According to Addala, "Seethamma" stands for the goddess Sita, "Vakitlo" for India and "Sirimalle Chettu" for the Indian family. The mentality of a person who does not smile at a fellow human but preaches the need for change in society and improvement in human relations was the basis of the film's script. The director tells the story of two brothers of different ages who are not expressive, showing them safeguarding their identities but having a deep love and respect for each other.

Addala travelled to Yanam and other places in East Godavari district to study the mentality and behaviour of the local people. He noticed that about 80 percent of the families had good fathers, and their sons (who were struggling to find jobs and establish themselves) reconciled easily after small disagreements. Addala decided to convey in the film that life would be easier if small problems can be corrected. Most of the characters, except Seetha, are drawn from real life; Babu's character represents youth, and Venkatesh and Prakash Raj's characters exemplify an elder brother and a middle-class father.

Soundtrack 

Seethamma Vakitlo Sirimalle Chettu soundtrack was composed by Mickey J Meyer, with lyrics by Ananta Sriram and Sirivennela Seetharama Sastry. Aditya Music acquired its marketing rights in early June 2012, and the soundtrack was released at an event at Ramanaidu Studios in Nanakramguda, Hyderabad, on 7 December 2012. A critical and commercial success, it was certified triple platinum at a 19 January 2013 ceremony at Shilpakala Vedika in Hyderabad.

Release 
In late April 2012 the producers planned a worldwide release on 28 September, three weeks before the release of Cameraman Gangatho Rambabu. Seethamma Vakitlo Sirimalle Chettu release was expected to be postponed because of a filming delay after Samantha had an adverse drug reaction. Raju later announced that the film would be released on 21 December for Christmas, but due to production delays its release was postponed to 11 January 2013 for the three-day Sankranthi holiday. At Babu's suggestion a statewide premiere was planned a day before the general theatrical release, with the producers hoping to earn 10 million from the premiere.

Seethamma Vakitlo Sirimalle Chettu was released on 101 screens (considered a record) in the United States and on eight screens in Canada. The film was released in New York, New Jersey, the San Francisco Bay Area and Los Angeles. Seethamma Vakitlo Sirimalle Chettu was the first South Indian film to be released in Manhattan, premiering on 10 January 2013 at the Times Square AMC Empire 25 theatre. The film opened worldwide on 1,500 screens. In Hyderabad and Secunderabad, it was released on 85 screens and the cities' eight multiplexes scheduled 100 shows per day; tickets for the first week sold out in one day. Raju scheduled screenings for women only on 14, 15 and 16 January.

A Tamil remake proved cost-prohibitive, leading to an announcement of the Tamil-dubbed version Anandam Anandame in early October 2013. Viji Creations acquired the dubbing rights and P. Rajarajan wrote the dialogue for the dubbed version. It was also later dubbed and released in Tamil again under the title Nenjamellam Pala Vannam which was released in 2018.

Marketing 
The film's first-look teaser was released on 31 May 2012. Within a day of its release the teaser attracted 227,319 views on YouTube, and 9,416 members shared it on Facebook. First-look posters saying "Happy birthday to my brother Mahesh Babu", signed by Venkatesh, were released on 8 August. Publicist B. A. Raju announced that another teaser would be released on 12 December, the day before Venkatesh's birthday, since the producers of Businessman (2012) had released a first-look poster featuring Babu on 11 November 2011. The film's theatrical trailer was released on 13 December. Red Label and Mega Mart entered into a co-branding partnership for the film.

Pre-release revenue 
Seethamma Vakitlo Sirimalle Chettu television broadcast rights were sold for 85 million to an undisclosed channel in early June 2012. Theatrical distribution rights for Krishna district were sold for 27.5 million in late October 2012. Vintage Creations and Srinikethan Films acquired the theatrical distribution rights for East Godavari and Nellore districts for 28.3 million and 18.5 million, respectively. 14 Reels Entertainment, in association with FICUS, acquired the film's overseas theatrical distribution rights in late November 2012.

Home media 
Seethamma Vakitlo Sirimalle Chettu Indian VCD, DVD and Blu-ray discs were marketed by Aditya Videos. Overseas DVD and Blu-ray discs were released in June 2013 by Bhavani Videos, and global television broadcast rights were acquired by MAA TV. After its global television premiere, Seethamma Vakitlo Sirimalle Chettu registered a TRP rating of 20.00, the second highest rating ever for a Telugu film after Magadheera (2009) which registered 22.00. It retained that spot until the global television premiere of Baahubali: The Beginning (2015) and Srimanthudu (2015). They registered the TRP ratings of 21.84 and 21.24 respectively, pushing Seethamma Vakitlo Sirimalle Chettu to the fourth spot. The film's premiere took place on MAA TV on 9 June 2013.

Reception

Critical reception 
Seethamma Vakitlo Sirimalle Chettu received generally positive reviews. Sangeetha Devi Dundoo of The Hindu called the film a "delightful family drama with its celebration of family bonds, love and marriage laced with laughter", and Addala "wants to leave his audience with a thought, wants them to reflect on their relationships and overlook skirmishes that can sour family bonds". Dundoo cited Guhan's cinematography as one of the film's highlights, and praised its performances. Mahalakshmi Prabhakaran of Daily News and Analysis called the film a "heartwarming watch that has its emotions and underlying message in the right place". Calling Guhan's cinematography and its music wonderful, Prabhakaran also praised the film's cast.

According to IANS, "It is very unlikely to point out a single dull moment in this crowd-pleasing, tear-jerking healthy family entertainer that presents a story akin to every household". The reviewer added that the film "may or may not inspire one and all, but it will definitely send everybody back home with a smile". Shekhar of Oneindia Entertainment called the film a "good family entertainer", adding that the audience would immerse themselves in the film and "feel like they are watching some real life sequences from in and around their house". IndiaGlitz called the film a "heart-tugging family entertainer": "If Mahesh Babu seems to be the most important star, be it in terms of the screen time or the number of lines he gets to speak, it is Venkatesh who takes a lion's share in SVSC's story. It is around Peddodu that Srikanth Addala weaves a drama full of modest emotional highs and lilting moments".

Karthik Pasupulate of The Times of India gave Seethamma Vakitlo Sirimalle Chettu 3.5 out of five stars, calling it a "good old fashioned family drama sans the usual masala" and adding that it is "pleasant, well intended, and has some tender moments as well, but does it pack enough entertainment value". Pasupulate praised the performances, calling them understated like the rest of the film. Sify gave the film 3.25 out of five stars: "Seethamma Vaakitlo Sirimalle Chettu definitely makes you moist-eyed as you walk out from the theatre but it runs on a flimsy story. It is a film that reinforces the great Indian family values and is also a manipulative film like most Sooraj Barjatya films." The reviewer praised the film's climax, adding that Babu's performance, the score, cinematography and its later scenes overshadowed its flaws.

Radhika Rajamani of Rediff gave the film three out of five stars: "While it cruises along smoothly, delving into relationships within the family, without too many conflicts or twists and turns, one feels an emotional disconnect sometimes because society has changed so much from what is portrayed on screen". She added, "The storyline is realistic, in that it is all about the happenings in a middle class home, but it's more about situations and doesn't develop as a story. So if you want to see a non-violent, family values kind of film, this one is for you. It's just that it seems a little out of date." B. V. S. Prakash of Deccan Chronicle gave the film 2.5 out of five stars, calling it a "dampener" and its scenes repetitive and tedious. Prakash praised the performances, however, especially those of Venkatesh and Babu.

Box office 
Seethamma Vakitlo Sirimalle Chettu earned 9.81 crore on its first day at the AP-Nizam box office—according to trade analyst Trinath, probably the best-ever opening for a star-studded Telugu film. Taran Adarsh called the film's opening "mindblowing" as it earned US$205,347 (1.13 crore) at 62 locations on its Thursday previews in the United States. It earned $338,228 on Friday, bringing its two-day total to $552,041—the most successful opening for a Telugu film in the U.S. Seethamma Vakitlo Sirimalle Chettu netted 25.01 crore in four days at the global box office, the most successful opening in Babu and Venkatesh's careers. The film grossed $1,262,100 (6.87 crore) from reported screens in its first four-day weekend in the United States, affecting other films (such as Naayak and Matru Ki Bijlee Ka Mandola) and surpassing the US lifetime earnings of Gabbar Singh (2012). The film's earnings declined 25 percent on its fifth day, and its five-day total nett was 28.66 crore. Earning about 35 crore in its first week, Seethamma Vakitlo Sirimalle Chettu broke box-office records in several parts of the world. The film's earnings declined 50 percent over its second weekend, with a ten-day global box-office nett of 45 crore. In its second U.S. weekend the film earned $203,160 (1.09 crore), bringing its ten-day U.S. total to $1,548,709 (8.31 crore) and setting a record for a Telugu film in that country.

By the end of its second week, Seethamma Vakitlo Sirimalle Chettu netted 51 crore at the global box office. In the film's third weekend it was affected by Vishwaroopam, earning about 0.193 crore from 20 screens in the United States. It completed its 50-day run on 3 March in 25 theatres. Seethamma Vakitlo Sirimalle Chettu netted 38.75 crore at the AP/Nizam box office during its run, earning a distributor share of 51 crore at the global box office and declared a commercial success. It was the second-highest-grossing Telugu film of the year, after Attarintiki Daredi.

Accolades 

Seethamma Vakitlo Sirimalle Chettu was one of twenty Telugu film entries for the 61st National Film Awards. The film received seven nominations at the 61st Filmfare Awards South, including Best Telugu film, Best Director — Telugu and Best Actor — Telugu. It won two awards: Best Actor — Telugu (Babu) and Best Female Playback Singer — Telugu (K. S. Chithra for "Seethamma Vakitlo Sirimalle Chettu").

The film received eleven nominations at the 3rd South Indian International Movie Awards, where Venkatesh and Babu were nominated for Best Actor — Telugu and Anjali and Jayasudha were nominated for Best Supporting Actor Female — Telugu. It won three awards, again for Best Actor — Telugu (Babu) and Best Female Playback Singer — Telugu (Chithra for "Seethamma Vakitlo Sirimalle Chettu") besides Anantha Sreeram, who earned the award for Best Lyricist — Telugu for the same song. Babu also received the "Best Actor for the Year 2013" award at the 2015 TSR – TV9 National Film Awards.

Notes

References

External links 
 

2013 films
Films directed by Srikanth Addala
Films scored by Mickey J Meyer
Indian drama films
2010s Telugu-language films
Films about women in India
Social realism in film
Films shot in Hyderabad, India
Indian feminist films
Films about Indian weddings
Films shot in Tirunelveli
Films shot in Chennai
Films shot in Maharashtra
Films shot in Ahmedabad
Films shot in Kerala
Films about brothers
Films about families
Indian family films
2013 drama films
Films set in Andhra Pradesh
Films shot in Andhra Pradesh
Films set in Konaseema
Sri Venkateswara Creations films